is a passenger railway station located in the city of Izumi, Osaka Prefecture, Japan, operated by the Semboku Rapid Railway.

Lines

Station layout
The station consists of one  island platform with an elevated station building.

Platforms

Adjacent stations

History
Izumi-Chūō Station opened on April 1, 1995.

Passenger statistics
In fiscal 2019, the station was used by an average of 33,095 passengers daily (boarding passengers only).

Surrounding area
 Izumi City Plaza
 Izumi City History Museum
St. Andrew's University 
Izumi City Kitaikeda Junior High School

See also
List of railway stations in Japan

References

External links

 Izumi-Chūō Station Official Site

Railway stations in Japan opened in 1995
Railway stations in Osaka Prefecture
Izumi, Osaka